Cayton railway station was a minor railway station serving the village of Cayton on the Yorkshire Coast Line from Scarborough to Hull and was opened on 5 October 1846 by the York and North Midland Railway. It closed on 5 May 1952.

The former signal box here has though been demolished, as the level crossing it worked has been converted to automatic barrier operation. One platform has also survives, though it is heavily overgrown and difficult to see.

References

Disused railway stations in the Borough of Scarborough
Railway stations in Great Britain opened in 1846
Railway stations in Great Britain closed in 1952
Stations on the Hull to Scarborough line
1846 establishments in England
Former York and North Midland Railway stations
George Townsend Andrews railway stations